In martial arts, a throw is a grappling technique that involves off-balancing or lifting an opponent, and throwing them to the ground, in Japanese martial arts referred to as nage-waza, 投げ技,  "throwing technique". Throws are a subset of takedown (grappling). Certain throwing techniques called sacrifice throws (sutemi-waza, 捨身技, "sacrifice technique") involve putting oneself in a potentially disadvantageous position, such as on the ground, in order to execute a throw.

Types of throws
There are several major types of throw, among Asian martial arts, Judo has the most developed throwing techniques and throws are considered its specialty.

Most throws are named by describing the circumvention point of the throw (e.g., hip throw, shoulder throw, wrist throw etc.), or the nature of effect of the throw on the opponent (e.g., heaven and earth throw, valley drop, body drop) with variations are given descriptive names. The names used here are attributed to Jujutsu throws (and hence judo/Aikido throws) are descriptions in Japanese. It is conventional for the Japanese to name their throws in this manner, and many western martial art dojos have given English names to the throws feeling that it is easier for English speaking students to remember the names of throws if they can associate the throws by the descriptive nature of the throw name.

In Judo, throws are divided into six categories—hand techniques, leg techniques, hip techniques, shoulder techniques, as well as sacrifice throws to the rear and side.

Shoulder and back throws
A shoulder throw involves throwing an opponent over the shoulder. A shoulder throw which lifts the opponent from the ground is in Japanese referred to as seoi-nage (背負い投げ, "Back Throw"), while a throw which involves upsetting the opponent’s balance and pulling the opponent over the shoulder is referred to as seoi-otoshi (背負落とし, "Back Drop"). Seoi-nage is one of the most used throws in  judo competition. One study indicated that approximately 56% of judokas implemented the technique.

A common shoulder throw is judo's ippon seoinage ("Single-Handed Back Throw") or the similar flying mare in wrestling.

Leg throws, reaps, and trips
In a leg reap, the attacker uses one of their legs to reap one or both of their opponent's legs off the ground. Generally the opponent's weight is placed on the leg that is reaped away. This coupled with the attacker controlling the opponent's body with their hands causes the opponent to fall over. Common leg reaps are judo's Ouchi Gari, Kouchi Gari, Osoto Gari, and Kosoto Gari. There are similar techniques in wrestling, including the inside and outside trips.

Somewhat similar to leg reaps involve a hooking or lifting action with the attacking leg instead of a reaping action. The border between the two types of throw can be unclear, and many throws will exhibit characteristics of both reaps and trips, however, the difference is that a reap is one smooth move, like that of a scythe, whereas a hook is pulling the opponents leg up first, and then swinging it away. Common leg trips are hooking variations of Ouchi Gari and Osoto Gari along with Kosoto Gake, referred to as inside and outside trips in Western wrestling.

Sacrifice throws
Sacrifice throws require the thrower to move into a potentially disadvantageous position in order to be executed, such as falling to the ground. The momentum of the falling body adds power to the throw and requires comparatively little strength, compared to the effect. In Judo (as well as in other martial arts), these throws are called sutemi waza and are further divided into rear (ma sutemi waza) and side (yoko sutemi waza) throws. In Judo, these throws are limited to a specific grade and higher due to the element of danger that is placed upon both the uke (receiver) and the tori (thrower).

Hip throws
A hip throw involves using the thrower's hip as a pivot point, by placing the hip in a lower position than an opponent's center of gravity. There are several types of hip throws such as O Goshi, which is often taught first to novices. Hip throws in Judo are called Koshi Waza, and in Aikido or Sumo they are called koshinage.

Pick-ups

Pickups involve lifting the opponent off the ground and then bringing them down again. Common pick-ups are lifting variations of the double leg takedown, Judo's Te Guruma or sukui nage (both classified as hand throws Ganseki otoshi) and the suplex from wrestling, in which the attacker lifts their opponents body vertically and throws the opponent over their own center of gravity while executing a back fall (usually accompanied by a back arch). Variations of the suplex are common in most forms of wrestling and sometimes used in mixed martial arts competition. In Judo, the ura-nage throw is a version of the suplex, but it is classified as a sacrifice throw.

List of throws 

Some of the more common throwing techniques are listed below. This is not an exhaustive list and the techniques may be referred to by other names in different styles. An English translation and a common Japanese equivalent are given.
Major hip throw (O Goshi)
Floating hip (Uki Goshi)
Rear hip throw (Ushiro Goshi)
Stamp throw
Major wheel (O Guruma)
Transitional hip throw (Utsuri Goshi)
Hip wheel (Koshi Guruma)
Sweeping hip throw (Harai Goshi)
Inner Thigh throw (Uchi Mata)
Sweeping knee throw
Sweeping ankle throw
Leg wheel (Ashi Guruma)
Major outer wheel (Osoto Guruma)
Inside hook throw (Kouchi Gake)
Outer hook throw
Cross hook
Knee wheel (Hiza Guruma)
Advancing foot sweep (Deashi Harai)
Lapel Back throw (Eri Seoinage)
Single-Handed Shoulder throw (Ippon Seoinage)
Double-Handed Shoulder throw (Morote Seoinage)
Major inner reaping, inside trip (Ouchi Gari)
Minor inner reaping (Kouchi Gari)
Major outer reaping, outside trip (Osoto Gari)
Minor outer reap (Kosoto Gari)
Minor outer hook (Kosoto Gake)
Propping ankle throw (Sasae Tsurikomi Ashi)
Floating hip throw (Uki Goshi)
Body drop (Tai Otoshi)
Lifting hip throw (Tsuri Goshi)
Sleeve lifting-pulling hip throw (Sode Tsurikomi Goshi)
Floating drop (Uki Otoshi)
Outside wrap (Soto Makikomi)
Inside wrap (Uchi Makikomi)
Springing hip throw (Hane Goshi)
Double spring hip throw.
Shoulder wheel, fireman's carry (Kata Guruma)
Valley drop (Tani Otoshi)
Stomach throw (Tomoe Nage)
Side circle
Corner throw
Head hip and knee throw
Reverse head hip and knee throw
Rear head hip and knee throw
Front scoop throw
Rear scoop throw
Neck throw (Kubi Nage)
Flying scissors takedown (Kani Basami)
Flying figure ten (Tobi Juji Gatame)
Wrist-based throws, especially Kotegaeshi (forearm return / supinating wrist lock)
Figure ten throw (Juji nage, not closely related to Juji Gatame)
Breath throw (Kokyu Nage, sometimes called timing throw or the twenty-year throw)
Rotary throw (Kaiten nage, sometimes called head-over-heels throw)
Heaven-and-earth throw (Tenchi nage)
Four corner throw (Shiho nage, not to be confused with Corner Drop)
Entering throw (Irimi nage, sometimes also simply called Kokyu nage (it's a specific variant))

See also

 Judo technique - Includes a list of all the throws in Judo
 Takedown

References

External links 

  SOMBO A Style of Wrestling: Chapter 5, Throwing and Scoring Techniques
(Wayback Machine copy)
 The 67 Throws of Kodokan Judo
 Collection of the 40 Throws of the Gokyo with Video Demonstrations

 
Martial art techniques
Kickboxing terminology